The Ministry of Foreign Affairs, European Union and Cooperation (MAEUEC) is a department of the Government of Spain in charge of planning, managing, carrying out and evaluating the country's foreign and international cooperation for development policies, paying special attention to the ones in relation to the European Union and Ibero-America, as well as coordinating and supervising all actions done in this areas by the other Ministries and Public Administrations. Likewise, it is responsible for promoting international economic, cultural and scientific relationships, taking part in the proposal and application of the migration policy, promoting cross-border and interterritorial cooperation, protecting Spaniards abroad and preparing, negotiating and processing the international treaties which Spain is part of.

The Foreign Ministry is the nationwide department who oversees the Foreign Action of the Spanish regions and other administrations as well as overseeing the Foreign Action of the constitutional bodies. In this sense, from the Ministry depends the State Foreign Service, the set of individuals, bodies and institutions with competence in foreign matters. The Foreign Service is composed for more than 215 diplomatic missions around the world, including embassies, consulates, and other facilities. Not including the 48 cooperation units of the AECID and the 87 Cervantes Institute centers.

The MAEUEC, created in 1714, is headed by the Foreign Minister, who is appointed by the Monarch at request of the Prime Minister. The minister is assisted by five main officials, the Secretary of State for Foreign Affairs, the Secretary of State for the European Union, the Secretary of State for International Cooperation, the Secretary of State for Ibero-America and the Under Secretary of Foreign Affairs. The current Foreign Minister is Mr. José Manuel Albares, former Spanish ambassador to France.

As of 2019, Spain had 215 diplomatic posts worldwide. Of these, 115 were embassies, 89 consulates and 11 other types of diplomatic representations, not counting the 48 cooperation units of the AECID or the 87 centers of the Cervantes Institute.

History

Early period 
Diplomacy was born with the first Nation-States, being Spain one of the oldest Nation-States that continues to exist today. The first diplomatic relations of Spain as a unified entity began to be carried out with the Catholic Monarchs, but strengthened by Charles I and Philip II because of the need to protect the interests of the Empire.

International relations are born with the Peace of Westphalia in 1648, which, in addition to supposing the end of the Thirty Years' War, meant the reinforcement of the Nation-State as a sovereign entity in its internal affairs and with sovereignty to maintain international relations. The ambassadors already existed and little by little they were reinforcing their duties, placing themselves as essential pieces of foreign policy, a foreign policy controlled by The Crown.

At the beginning of the reign of Philip V, in 1705, the King created the Office of First Secretary of State, a kind-of Prime Minister entrusted with foreign relations and the Marquess of Grimaldo was appointed the first Secretary. This is considered by some to be the origin of the Ministry of Foreign Affairs, but most consider the initial date to be on 30 November 1714 because in this day, the King created four specific secretariats: State (foreign affairs), Justice, War and Navy and Indies. There was a fifth body created this day, the Veeduría General, responsible for finance and treasury affairs.

Late period 
The position of First Secretary of State remained unchanged until the first third of the 19th century. After the Napoleonic Wars, the international relations changed and do so the foreign relations of Spain. In 1833 the Office was modified and renamed Ministry of State, with Francisco Cea Bermúdez as minister. With this change, Spain was endowed with an analogous institution to which the rest of European nations had in which two new bodies worked on, consular officials and the diplomats, who would eventually merge in 1928.

It was precisely in 1928 that the Ministry of State merged with the Office of the Prime Minister returning to the times when the First Secretary of State was a king-of Premier with foreign affairs responsibilities. This just lasted two years because in 1930 the offices were split again.

In spite of the continuous Spanish political instability, international relations and the Ministry remained stable, suffering the biggest change in 1938 when it was renamed Ministry of Foreign Affairs and the current headquarters are established in the Palace of Santa Cruz. A year later the Palace of Viana in Madrid was established as the official residence of the Foreign Minister and in 1942, the Diplomatic School was created. During the Spanish transition to democracy, the Foreign Ministry was a fundamental institution, since it was in charge of transmitting to the world the political change that Spanish society was living and promoting relations with Ibero-America and other priority regions for Spanish foreign policy.

Other important role that the Ministry assumed during this period was managing entry into the European Community. During the short period of 1979-1981 the responsibilities on foreign affairs were share between the Foreign Ministry and the Ministry for Relations with the European Communities (which mainly focused on the negotiations for the entry) and after 1981 the second merged into the first Ministry as a Secretariat of State.

In 1988 the Spanish Agency for International Development Cooperation (AECID) was created and in this sense in 2004 the Ministry was renamed «Ministry of Foreign Affairs and Cooperation» with the aim of highlighting the role of Spain as a country committed to supporting the most disadvantaged peoples through cooperation for development. In 2000 the headquarters were moved to a 50,455 square meters building in Madrid but because of environmental and conditioning problems led to the return to the Palace of Santa Cruz in 2004–5.

In 2016 the Government approved the reform of the old headquarters of the Ministry and the move it is planned to early 2020. Currently, the employees of the department work on two buildings, the central headquarters at the Santa Cruz Palace and the Ágora Towers, two rented towers in the north of Madrid.

The last change took place in 2018, becoming the «Ministry of Foreign Affairs, European Union and Cooperation», thus emphasizing the Europeanist vocation of Spain and the primary importance that Spanish foreign policy grants, through this Ministry, to the European Union.

In January 2022, the ministry opened its new main headquarters in Plaza del Marqués de Salamanca.

Structure 
The Ministry of Foreign Affairs, European Union and Cooperation is organised in the following superior bodies:

 The Secretariat of State for Foreign and Global Affairs.
 The Directorate-General for Foreign Policy and Security.
 The Directorate-General for the United Nations, International Organizations and Human Rights.
 The Directorate-General for the Maghreb, the Mediterranean and the Middle East.
 The Directorate-General for Africa.
 The Directorate-General for North America, Eastern Europe, Asia and Pacific.
 The Secretariat of State for the European Union.
The General Secretariat for the European Union.
The Directorate-General for Integration and Coordination of General Affairs of the European Union.
The Directorate-General for the Coordination of the Internal Market and other Community Policies.
The Directorate-General for Western, Central and Southeast Europe.
 The Secretariat of State for International Cooperation.
 The Directorate-General for Sustainable Development Policies.
 The Secretariat of State for Ibero-America and the Caribbean and Spanish in the World.
The Directorate-General for Ibero-America and the Caribbean.
The Directorate-General for Spanish in the World.
 The Undersecretariat of Foreign Affairs, European Union and Cooperation.
 The Technical General Secretariat.
 The Directorate-General for the Foreign Service.
 The Directorate-General for Spaniards Abroad and Consular Affairs.
 The Directorate-General for Protocol, Chancellery and Orders; headed by the Introducer of Ambassadors.
 The Directorate-General for Economic Diplomacy.
The Directorate-General for Communication, Public Diplomacy and Media, traditionally known as Diplomatic Information Office.
The Migration Affairs Office.

Agencies 

 The Spanish Agency for International Development Cooperation.
 The Cervantes Institute.
 The Pious Work of the Holy Places in Jerusalem.

See also 
 List of Foreign Ministers of Spain

References

External links 
 Official Website of the Ministry of Foreign Affairs and Cooperation, in English

 
Foreign Affairs and Cooperation
Foreign Affairs
Foreign relations of Spain
Spain
1714 establishments in Spain
Foreign
Ministries established in 1714